Peter MacArthur (born June 20, 1985) is an American former professional ice hockey player and current head coach of the Adirondack Thunder of the ECHL.

Playing career
On July 9, 2009, he was signed as a free agent to a one-year contract by the Chicago Blackhawks. After signing with the Las Vegas Wranglers of the ECHL for the 2011–12, MacArthur enjoyed a successful stint with the Lake Erie Monsters of the AHL, before returning to lead the Wranglers to the Kelly Cup finals.

On July 13, 2012, MacArthur signed his first European contract, on a one-year deal with Augsburger Panther of the German Deutsche Eishockey Liga. During the 2012–13 season, MacArthur established himself on the Panthers top scoring line. He finished second on the club with 34 points in 52 games to be rewarded with a one-year contract extension on March 23, 2013.

On August 6, 2014, MacArthur secured a try-out contract with the Vienna Capitals of the Austrian Hockey League. After establishing a role with the Capitals for the season, MacArthur signed a one-year contract to remain in Austria with the Graz 99ers on June 17, 2015.

In the 2015–16 season, MacArthur played in 26 games with the 99ers but was unable to adapt in Graz before he opted to return to North America, signing with the Adirondack Thunder on December 19, 2015. He quickly returned to his scoring ways and was later named team Captain in finishing with 36 points in 46 games.

After two seasons with the Thunder, MacArthur left as a free agent in order to sign with fellow ECHL club, the Allen Americans on September 30, 2017. In the 2017–18 season, MacArthur appeared in 22 games with the Americans, posting 13 points before his year was cut short due to injury.

As a free agent MacArthur signed a one-year contract to return to his previous team, the Adirondack Thunder, on July 9, 2018. Following the conclusion of the 2018–19 season, MacArthur initially ended his 11-year professional career.

On November 20, 2019, MacArthur returned to the professional circuit, agreeing to a contract for the remainder of the season with Italian club, HC Pustertal Wölfe of the Alps Hockey League. He made 17 appearances with the club, posting 15 points in the Alps Hockey League, and 3 points through 6 Italian league games.

On July 8, 2020, MacArthur opted to return to North America and extend his career in the ECHL, agreeing to a contract with the Orlando Solar Bears. He was later released from his contract without featuring for the team. MacArthur sat out the 2020–21 season as a free agent, before opting to re-join the Adirondack Thunder in their return to ECHL on July 9, 2021.

On June 22, 2022, MacArthur ended his professional playing career with the Adirondack Thunder and was immediately announced as the team's new head coach.

Personal life
MacArthur is married to Cristina Blackwell, former host of Great Day SA on KENS5, and former weather reporter for Despierta America, Univision Network.

Career statistics

Awards and honors

References

External links

1985 births
Adirondack Thunder players
Allen Americans players
American men's ice hockey forwards
Augsburger Panther players
Boston University Terriers men's ice hockey players
Bridgeport Sound Tigers players
Fresno Falcons players
Graz 99ers players
Lake Erie Monsters players
Las Vegas Wranglers players
Living people
Peoria Rivermen (AHL) players
HC Pustertal Wölfe players
Rockford IceHogs (AHL) players
San Antonio Rampage players
Vienna Capitals players
Waterloo Black Hawks players
AHCA Division I men's ice hockey All-Americans